P14, P-14 or P.14 may refer to:

 P14 (tax), a British tax form
 Aviatik P.14, a German reconnaissance biplane
 Holbrook Municipal Airport, in Navajo County, Arizona, United States
 LSWR P14 class, a British steam locomotive
 P-14 radar, a Soviet radar system
 P14 road (Ukraine)
 Papyrus 14, a biblical manuscript
 Pattern 1914 Enfield, a British rifle
 Škoda-Kauba P14, a German fighter aircraft project

See also
 14P (disambiguation)